Nikolaus Resch is an Austrian sailor. At the 2004 Summer Olympics, he and team-mate, Nico Delle-Karth, competed in the mixed Skiff 49er event, finishing in 10th place.  They competed at together again at the 2008 Summer Olympics, finishing in 8th place.  At the 2012 Summer Olympics in the 49er class, the pairing finished in 4th place.

References

Austrian male sailors (sport)
Living people
Olympic sailors of Austria
Sailors at the 2004 Summer Olympics – 49er
Sailors at the 2008 Summer Olympics – 49er
Sailors at the 2012 Summer Olympics – 49er
1984 births
Sportspeople from Klagenfurt
Sailors at the 2016 Summer Olympics – 49er
20th-century Austrian people
21st-century Austrian people